Ryta Turava (Belarusian Рыта Турава; Russian Rita Turova, Рита Турова, born 28 December 1980) is an athlete from Belarus, competing in race walking. She was born in Vitebsk.

Her sister, Alesya Turava, is also a successful athlete, champion of Belarus in track and field (1500 metres: bronze medalist at the 2002 European Indoor Championships.

The all-time all-time women's 10-km race-walk record is held by Margarita Turova, at 42:05.

Achievements

References
 

1980 births
Living people
Belarusian female racewalkers
Athletes (track and field) at the 2004 Summer Olympics
Athletes (track and field) at the 2008 Summer Olympics
Olympic athletes of Belarus
Sportspeople from Vitebsk
World Athletics Championships medalists
European Athletics Championships medalists
World Athletics Race Walking Team Championships winners